Arthur A. Piasecki (May 5, 1917 – August 13, 1986 ) was an American politician from Pennsylvania who served as a Republican member of the Pennsylvania State Senate for the 22nd district from 1969 to 1970.

References

Republican Party Pennsylvania state senators
1986 deaths
1917 births
20th-century American politicians